Aravind Kumar Arali was elected unopposed on 4 June 2018 to the Karnataka Legislative Council. Out of 11 seats, the INC won 4 seats, JD(S) 2 and BJP 5.

References

Living people
Indian National Congress politicians
Year of birth missing (living people)
Indian National Congress politicians from Karnataka